The Emerald Route is a travelogue by R. K. Narayan. It was published by Indian Thought Publications in 1980. It is a pseudo-travel guide for Karnataka, India. The book was commissioned by the Government of Karnataka, and the initial non-commercial version was published in 1977 as part of a government publication. The book is focused on local history, culture and heritage, and does not exhibit much of Narayan's characteristic personal narrative.

References

Books by R. K. Narayan
1977 non-fiction books
Tourism in Karnataka
Books about India
Indian Thought Publications books
Travelogues